The 2011 North American League season will be the inaugural season of the North American League, after three previous independent baseball leagues in the Golden Baseball League, United Baseball League and the Northern League merged to form the NAL, set for 12 teams in 2011. However one of the teams, the Henderson Roadrunners never played as Norse Field wasn’t ready in time for the 2011 season.

References

2011 in baseball